Qashqabad (also Romanized as Qashqābād; also known as ‘Eshqābād) is a village in Bizaki Rural District, Golbajar District, Chenaran County, Razavi Khorasan Province, Iran. At the 2006 census, its population was 350, in 80 families.

References 

Populated places in Chenaran County